Rajiv Gandhi Pharmacy College, Trikaripur is a professional college of Trikaripur near Payyanur in Kerala, India.

History
The college was established in 2007. It got affiliation with the Kannur University.

Courses offered
 B.Pharm. 60 seats

Contact Information
 Address:  Rajiv Gandhi Institute of Pharmacy, Meeliyat, Trikaripur, Kasaragod
 Principal : Dr. M. Paridhavi  Ph.D.

References

Colleges affiliated to Kannur University
Colleges in Kasaragod district
Pharmacy schools in India